The P-800 Oniks, also known in export markets as Yakhont, is a Soviet / Russian supersonic anti-ship cruise missile developed by NPO Mashinostroyeniya as a ramjet version of P-80 Zubr. Its GRAU designation is 3M55, the air launched Kh-61 variant also exists. The missile has the NATO codename SS-N-26 "Strobile". Development officially started in 1983, and in the 1990s the anti-ship missile was tested on the Project 1234.7 ship. In 2002 the missile passed the whole range of trials and was commissioned. It is reportedly a replacement for the P-270 Moskit, and possibly also of the P-700 Granit.

Description
The missile is carried in flight by aerodynamic lift. The solid-propellant booster is located in the ramjet's combustion chamber and is ejected by the airflow after it has burned out.

Advantages
Over-the-horizon firing range
Full autonomy of combat use ("fire and forget")
A set of flexible ("low-profile sea-skimming", "high-low") trajectories
High supersonic speed in all phases of flight
Full harmonization for a wide range of platforms (surface ships, submarines and land-based launchers)
Possible use of the missile in electronic countermeasures environment and under enemy fire

Operational history

Syria
In 2010 Sergei Prikhodko, senior adviser to the Russian President, has said that Russia intends to deliver P-800 to Syria based on the contracts signed in 2007. Syria received two Bastion missile systems with 36 missiles each (72 in total). The missiles' test was broadcast by Syrian state TV.

In May 2013, Russia continued the contract delivery to the Syrian government supplying missiles with an advanced radar to make them more effective to counter any future foreign military invasion. A warehouse containing the Bastion missiles was destroyed by an Israeli air strike on Latakia on 5 July 2013, but US intelligence analysts believe that some missiles had been removed before the attack.

Oniks missiles were reportedly used in 2016 against ISIL targets.

Russian invasion of Ukraine

In May 2022, Russia’s Defense Minister announced that Russia used high precision Oniks missiles during Russia’s invasion in Ukraine. On 1 May Oniks missiles were used to destroy military equipment near the city of Odesa. There are other reported use of Oniks missiles in Donbas during the same conflict.

Specifications
 Length: 8.9 m
 Diameter: 0.7 m
 Wingspan: 1.7 m
 Weight: 3,100 kg
 Speed at altitude: 750 m/s (Mach 2.6)
 Surface speed: Mach 2
 Engine: ramjet, weight 200 kg, 4 tons of thrust
 Range: 120–300 km / 600 km for Russian ship/sub deployed non-export model
 for the combined trajectory (hi-lo) – 300 km
 for low-altitude trajectory (lo-lo) – 120 km
 Flight altitude of 10,000–14,000 m
 Warhead: national version: 300 kg semi-armour piercing HE, thermonuclear; export version: 200 kg HE
 Fuel: jet fuel T-6

Radar homing head

 all-weather monopulse active-passive, with frequency hopping
 Immunity: high, from active spoofing, dipole clouds
 Range: 50 km active
 Launchable sea state – up to 7 points
 Warm-up time from power on: no more than 2 min
 Current consumption at 27 V circuit: up to 38 A
 Maximum angle of the target search: ± 45 °
 Homing weight: 85 kg

Variants
 3M55 Oniks – Base version for Russia.
 P-800 Yakhont – Export version of Oniks.
 P-800 Bolid - Submarine-launched version of Yakhont.
 BrahMos – Co-developed by Russia and India, based on Oniks, produced by BrahMos Aerospace Private Limited in India. BrahMos-II, a hypersonic version is also being developed.  The P-800 was used as the basis for the joint Russian-Indian supersonic missile BrahMos.
 Bastion-P – Coast mobile missile system. Officially it entered service in 2015.
 Kh-61 - Air launched air to surface version.
 Oniks-M - version of Oniks with improved range (up to 800 km), accuracy and ECCM capabilities.

Platforms

Naval
Current
Buyan-M-class corvette

 (export version)

Future

Land
Standard batteries of the K-300 Bastion-P (Бастион-П-Подвижный):
 4 self-propelled launchers K-340P with 2 "Yakhont" missiles (crew of 3 persons)
 1–2 Command and Control vehicles (ASBU) PBRK (crew of 5 persons)
 1 security alert car (MOBD)
 4 Transportation and loading vehicles (TLV K342P)

Operators

  Hezbollah – 12 missiles with diverse launching platforms.
  – 3 "Bastion-P" complexes delivered in 2010, all the complexes taken into service with the Russian Black Sea Fleet's 11th Independent Coastal Missile-Artillery Brigade stationed near Anapa and the Project 1234.7 Nakat, a one-off Nanuchka IV-class corvette commissioned in 1987 with 2x6 Oniks. The "Bastion-P" is deployed by Russian forces in Crimea. One more Bastion-P was delivered in 2015. 2 Bastion systems are in service with the Northern Fleet and at least one with Western Military District (Baltic Fleet). Newest class of Russian nuclear-powered attack submarines, Yasen-class submarine, can also launch the missile. Submarine-launched variant entered service in 2016. Two Bastion missile systems delivered in 2017 and one more in 2018. Totally 4 Bal and Bastion systems in 2018. One more system delivered for the Pacific Fleet in early 2019. Totally 3 Bastion systems and 55 Oniks were delivered in 2019. The Russian Defense Ministry concluded a contract at the Army-2020 forum for purchasing cruise missiles 3M55N Oniks. 3 more delivered during 2021.
  – 2 "Bastion-P" complexes delivered in 2011, 72 missiles.
  – at least 2 "Bastion-P" land-based coastal defense systems delivered with at least 40 missiles.

See also
3M-54 Kalibr
3M-51 Alfa

References

External links
SS-N-26 (Federation of American Scientists)
Sunburns, Yakhonts, Alfas and the Region (Australian Aviation, Sept 2000) (PDF)
www.dtig.org Russian/Sovjet Sea-based Anti-Ship Missiles (pdf)
Russia would supply Syria with P-800 Yakhont cruise missiles

Weapons of Russia
 
P-800
Cruise missiles of Russia
Nuclear cruise missiles of Russia
Submarine-launched cruise missiles of Russia
P-800
Ramjet engines
Surface-to-surface missiles
NPO Mashinostroyeniya products
Military equipment introduced in the 2000s
Fire-and-forget weapons